William "B.J." Lawson (born March 30, 1974) is a Republican Party politician who ran for the United States House of Representatives in North Carolina's 4th congressional district (seat currently held by David Price) in both the 2008 and 2010 elections.

Background
Born in Florida, Lawson attended Lakeland Senior High School in Lakeland, Florida, where he was president of the student council. He moved to North Carolina in 1992, where he graduated from Duke University with a degree in biomedical and electrical engineering and then from Duke Medical School in 2000.

During his time at Duke Medical School, Lawson became annoyed with the obscure and outdated methods doctors used to access patient data. A year into his neurosurgery residency with Duke (at Durham Regional Hospital), Lawson left to start, with another Duke Physician, Alan Ying,  a software company that would help doctors access that data in a more timely fashion, MercuryMD. The company focused on providing easier ways for physicians and nurses to access patient records through PDAs. MercuryMD grew to serve 200 hospitals and had 70 employees.

The company was sold to Thomson Corporation, a multinational conglomerate, which then merge with Reuters Thomson Reuters. Thomson Reuters then divested the healthcare division to a stand-alone company Truven Healthcare Analytics, which was purchased by IBM Watson Health in 2016.

2008 Congressional campaign
Lawson said that his time as an entrepreneur led him to begin seeking answers to questions about the healthcare system and national debt, which led to his campaign for office.

Primary election
Lawson's primary campaign focused on issues such as the higher cost of food and the overspending of the federal government. Lawson defeated former Orange County GOP chair Augustus Cho to face David Price in the general election.

General election
Lawson was described as a "hybrid candidate," able to gather the support of Democrats discontent with incumbent 4th District representative David Price's record on various issues; at least one of Lawson's county organizers is a lifelong Democrat and a Hillary Clinton and Barack Obama supporter. Lawson gave out more than 50,000 copies of the United States Constitution during the course of his campaign.  Lawson obtained 151,672 votes, about 36% of the vote, and the incumbent Price received 263,151 votes and 63% of the vote in the general election; there were no other candidates in the race.

Lawson failed to achieve a significantly greater percentage of the vote than the past two opponents.
Lawson ran television ads against Price, which Price's opponents typically do not do.  National right wing-libertarian, David H. Koch and Sarah Scaife-funded publication Reason called Lawson "one of the most credible Republican challengers of 2008, period." Lawson raised nearly $600,000 in a district in which the previous Republican contender, Lt. Col. Steve Acuff, raised only $50,000 in 2006. Lawson ordered 50,000 pocket copies of the United States Constitution to hand out to voters during the 2008 election cycle.

Lawson raised almost $600,000 for the campaign, helped with $170,000 in one day during a designated money bomb. His campaign headquarters was in Cary, North Carolina.
Lawson's campaign criticized Price for his record on civil liberties and accused Price of not reading bills before he votes on them. Price ran ads against Lawson and brought in Washington, DC staffers to assist in his re-election campaign. Lawson organized a "Peace, Prosperity & Liberty" concert and forum at UNC-Chapel Hill with Jim Neal, and Bruce Fein. Lawson and Price also faced off in what the Carrboro Citizen newspaper called a "lively" debate at UNC.

On April 28, U.S. Representative Ron Paul sent a letter to his mailing list endorsing Lawson in the 4th's Republican primary, and again on October 3 endorsing him in the general election.

Additional endorsements:
 Col. Steve Acuff, (USAF, Ret.) 2006 Republican candidate
 Tom Roberg, 1996 Republican candidate
 Republican Liberty Caucus
 Duke University College Republicans
 Grassroots North Carolina Forum-Political Victory Forum;
 Democrats for Lawson
 Radley Balko, nationally known journalist

2010 Congressional campaign
On February 10, 2010, Lawson announced that he would run again for US House of Representatives for district 4 of North Carolina. On May 4 Lawson was nominated as the Republican candidate with 45% of the vote.

On September 8, 2010, Price launched his reelection campaign. Price defeated Lawson in a rematch 56% to 44%.

Morgan Freeman ad controversy
On November 1, 2010, the Lawson for Congress campaign quickly pulled a specific campaign ad after allegations surfaced that the voice in the ad, claimed to be actor Morgan Freeman was an impersonator and not Freeman himself. Freeman confirmed that he was not the voice in the ad. BJ Lawson responded to the allegations by saying "This is terribly unfortunate and we apologize profusely to Morgan Freeman for what has happened. This is obviously not something we ever would want to misrepresent. Once we found out that our contracted advertisement was not narrated by Morgan Freeman, we immediately pulled our ads. Our campaign is  volunteers and we were presented with an opportunity to make a great ad -- unfortunately these political mercenaries completely misrepresented their offering and contract with us to take our money."

Political positions
Taking positions that are conservative and libertarian, Lawson has taken "strong stands on civil liberties protections" and against legislation such as the USA PATRIOT Act, citing concerns over rushing legislation through Congress without ample time for representatives to read it. Lawson  is also against the death penalty. 
Lawson spoke in opposition to the National Bio and Agro-Defense Facility which was proposed to be located in Butner, North Carolina. Lawson stated that various rare diseases, such as foot and mouth disease, classical swine fever, and Contagious bovine pleuropneumonia, would be studied at the laboratory and could pose hazards for North Carolina citizens located near the facility. His general election opponent David Price lobbied the federal government for the facility to be located in Butner.

Lawson is against the Iraq War.

Lawson has spoken against government borrowing and debt, saying "talk of an additional 'stimulus plan' that results in still more government borrowing simply pushes our economic crisis further onto our children and grandchildren." He believes money from entitlement trust funds should not be spent for other purposes. He did not support the Wall Street bailout bill, calling it the "No Bank Left Behind Act" and saying: "In our economy, the bailout plan assumes we need to fight a necessary reduction in debt with yet more debt. To use a medical analogy, debt is like amphetamines. It takes from the future to stimulate you today, and too much of it can kill you. We've become addicted to debt – why do we need more debt-fueled growth, and how much more can we tolerate? We need sustainable, long-term growth fueled by people saving and creating value in their communities – not artificial growth fueled by still more government debt that creates additional burdens for the future."

Lawson has said that he would attempt to eliminate the Congressional pension plan, calling it "an insult to the American worker"; he says if elected, he will not participate in the pension plan. He is also against subsidies for oil companies and believes getting rid of them would help foster alternative energy sources. Lawson has said that alternatives to a federal income tax should be looked into, including a carbon tax: "We want more jobs, productivity, and income – so it doesn't make sense to tax jobs, productivity, and income."

Lawson opposes a constitutional amendment banning same sex marriage and "unrelenting globalism driven by corporate interests."  He has a "disdain" for giving corporations the same legal rights as individuals.

For health care, Lawson is a proponent of health savings accounts and catastrophic insurance coverage. The Independent Weekly wrote: "Lawson is right in that insurance companies and bureaucracies are taking health care out of the hands of doctors and patients."

Honors
Congressman Walter B. Jones, Jr. of North Carolina presented Lawson with the Walter B. Jones Campus Defender of Freedom award at Duke University in April 2009.

Personal life
Lawson married his high school sweetheart, JoLynn, who attended college in South Carolina while he went to Duke. JoLynn Lawson is a former public school teacher in Durham, North Carolina. They have three children.

References

External links
 B.J. Lawson's Congressional campaign website
 Lawson's campaign blog
 Lawson on the issues

American bloggers
21st-century American businesspeople
Duke University Pratt School of Engineering alumni
North Carolina Republicans
1974 births
Living people
People from Plantation, Florida
Duke University School of Medicine alumni
Candidates in the 2008 United States elections
Candidates in the 2010 United States elections
People from Durham, North Carolina